Éric Trappier (born 6 January 1960) is a French businessman and engineer. Since January 2013, he has been the CEO of Dassault Aviation, French aircraft manufacturer of military and business jets, a subsidiary of Dassault Group.

Early life and career
Trappier was born and raised in Paris. He received an engineering degree from Telecom SudParis in 1983. He joined Dassault Aviation soon after graduation (1984). He has spent most of his career in the defense sector. He was named the company's international sales manager in 2002, and international general manager in 2006. He served as international executive vice president of the company before being named to the CEO position. He replaced Charles Edelstenne in that position when Edelstenne reached the company's mandatory retirement age (75).

On May 30, 2017, the AeroSpace and Defence Industries Association of Europe (ASD) announced the appointment of Mr Éric Trappier, Chairman and CEO of Dassault Aviation, as President of the Association.

On June 8, 2017, The Executive Committee of the French Aerospace Industries Association GIFAS has elected Mr Éric Trappier, the incumbent First Deputy Chairman of GIFAS, as the new Chairman of GIFAS.

Positions

Positions in the group
 Chairman and Chief Executive Officer of Dassault Aviation.

Other positions outside the group
Outside the group, Eric Trappier is: 
 President and administrator of the French Aerospace Industries Association GIFAS (Groupement des Industries Françaises Aéronautiques et Spatiales)
 Chairman of CIDEF (Council of French Defense Industries – Conseil des Industries de Défense Françaises).
 Administrator of Thales Group
 Administrator GIE RAFALE INTERNATIONAL
 Administrator ODAS, SOFEMA, EUROTRADIA.
 President of AeroSpace and Defence Industries Association of Europe (ASD).

References

External links
 Dassault Aviation official website
 Sofema website

1960 births
Living people
Businesspeople in aviation
Dassault Group
French chief executives
Businesspeople from Paris
Officiers of the Légion d'honneur